Jarrett Allen (born April 21, 1998) is an American professional basketball player for the Cleveland Cavaliers of the National Basketball Association (NBA). He played college basketball for the Texas Longhorns. Allen was selected 22nd overall by the Brooklyn Nets in the 2017 NBA draft. In January 2021, he was traded to the Cleveland Cavaliers as part of the four-team blockbuster James Harden trade. In February 2022, Allen was named to his first NBA All-Star Game.

High school career
Allen attended Round Rock High School in Round Rock, Texas for his freshman year of high school. He then transferred to St. Stephen's Episcopal School in Austin, Texas for his final three years and went on to win two SPC championships. He played in the 2016 McDonald's All-American Boys Game. He committed to the University of Texas at Austin to play college basketball.

Allen was rated as a five-star recruit and ranked no. 15 overall player in the Class of 2016.

College career
As a freshman at the University of Texas, Allen averaged 13.4 points and 8.4 rebounds per game. However, Texas finished a disappointing 11–22. His best game was a 22-point, 19-rebound performance in a 12-point loss to Kansas. After the season, he entered the 2017 NBA draft but did not initially hire an agent before deciding to forgo his remaining three years of collegiate eligibility.

Professional career

Brooklyn Nets (2017–2021)
Allen was selected with the 22nd overall pick in the 2017 NBA draft by the Brooklyn Nets, and signed his rookie scale deal with the Nets on July 20. He was 19 years 182 days when he made his NBA debut on October 20, becoming the second-youngest player ever to set foot on court for the Nets, just behind Derrick Favors. He finished the game with nine points on 3-for-3 shooting, two rebounds, and one block. On January 25, 2018, Allen joined the starting lineup for the first time and recorded a career-high 16 points and 12 rebounds in a 116–108 win over the Philadelphia 76ers. On February 2, in a game against the Los Angeles Lakers, Allen scored a career-high 20 points, as well as five rebounds and one block. On February 7, he grabbed a career-high 14 rebounds and scored 13 points in a 115–106 loss to the Detroit Pistons. On March 21, 2018, Allen recorded four blocks, which matched his career-high, as well as six rebounds, and nine points in a 111–105 loss to the Charlotte Hornets. On April 5, he got a career-high five blocks in a 119–111 victory over the Milwaukee Bucks.

On November 17, 2018, Allen recorded a career-high 24 points and grabbed 11 rebounds in a 127–119 loss to the Los Angeles Clippers. On November 20, he grabbed a season-high 14 rebounds and scored 13 points as the Nets defeated the Miami Heat. On January 16, 2019, Allen recorded 20 points and a career-high 24 rebounds in the Nets' 145–142 overtime victory over the Houston Rockets.

Cleveland Cavaliers (2021–present)
On January 14, 2021, Allen was traded to the Cleveland Cavaliers in a multi-player, four-team deal with the Rockets that sent James Harden to the Nets.

On July 23, 2021, Cleveland extended a qualifying offer to Allen, making him a restricted free agent. Allen signed a multi-year contract with Cleveland on August 6. On October 20, 2021, in a 132–121 loss to the Memphis Grizzlies, Allen became the first player since the shot clock was introduced in the 1954–55 NBA season to make 10 or more field goals without a miss in a season opener. Allen was named a replacement for Harden, for whom he was traded a year prior, on Team LeBron in the 2022 NBA All-Star Game.

Starting all the 56 games he played, Allen finished the 2021–22 season averaging a number of career best with 16.1 points, 10.8 rebounds, 1.6 assists, 1.3 blocks, and .8 steals per game, while shooting .677, .100, and .708 from the field, the three-point line, and on free throws, respectively, on 32.3 minutes per game. Alongside rookie and fellow Cavalier Evan Mobley, Allen led Cleveland from a .306 winning percentage and the league's sixth-worst defense to a .537 winning percentage and the league's fifth best defense for efficiency; it was .578 before Allen suffered a fractured finger injury in early March.

Career statistics

NBA

Regular season

|-
| style="text-align:left;"|
| style="text-align:left;"|Brooklyn
| 72 || 31 || 20.0 || .589 || .333 || .776 || 5.4 || .7 || .4 || 1.2 || 8.2
|-
| style="text-align:left;"|
| style="text-align:left;"|Brooklyn
| 80 || 80 || 26.2 || .590 || .133 || .709 || 8.4 || 1.4 || .5 || 1.5 || 10.9
|-
| style="text-align:left;"|
| style="text-align:left;"|Brooklyn
| 70 || 64 || 26.5 || .649 || .000 || .633 || 9.6 || 1.6 || .6 || 1.3 || 11.1
|-
| style="text-align:left;" rowspan="2"| 
| style="text-align:left;"|Brooklyn
| 12 || 5 || 26.7 || .677 ||  || .754 || 10.4 || 1.7 || .6 || 1.6 || 11.2
|-
| style="text-align:left;"|Cleveland
| 51 || 40 || 30.3 || .609 || .316 || .690 || 9.9 || 1.7 || .5 || 1.4 || 13.2
|-
| style="text-align:left;"|
| style="text-align:left;"|Cleveland
| 56 || 56 || 32.3 || .677 || .100 || .708 || 10.8 || 1.6 || .8 || 1.3 || 16.1
|- class="sortbottom"
| style="text-align:center;" colspan="2"|Career
| 341 || 276 || 26.6 || .626 || .189 || .699 || 8.7 || 1.4 || .5 || 1.4 || 11.6
|- class="sortbottom"
| style="text-align:center;" colspan="2"|All-Star
| 1 || 0 || 24.0 || .833 || .000 ||  || 9.0 || 1.0 || 1.0 || 2.0 || 10.0

Playoffs

|-
| style="text-align:left;"|2019
| style="text-align:left;"|Brooklyn
| 5 || 5 || 22.0 || .594 ||  || .850 || 6.8 || 2.2 || .6 || .6 || 11.0
|-
| style="text-align:left;"|2020
| style="text-align:left;"|Brooklyn
| 4 || 4 || 33.0 || .583 ||  || .813 || 14.8 || 2.3 || .5 || 1.8 || 10.3
|- class="sortbottom"
| style="text-align:center;" colspan="2"|Career
| 9 || 9 || 26.9 || .589 ||  || .833 || 10.3 || 2.2 || .6 || 1.1 || 10.7

College

|-
| style="text-align:left;"|2016–17
| style="text-align:left;"|Texas
| 33 || 33 || 32.2 || .566 || .000 || .564 || 8.4 || .8 || .6 || 1.5 || 13.4

Personal life
Allen's father Leonard was drafted by the Dallas Mavericks in the 1985 NBA draft and played at San Diego State and in Spain. His older brother Leonard Jr. committed to playing collegiate basketball for Baylor University, but took a leave of absence in 2017.

References

External links

 Texas Longhorns bio
 USA Basketball profile

1998 births
Living people
21st-century African-American sportspeople
African-American basketball players
American men's basketball players
Basketball players from Austin, Texas
Brooklyn Nets draft picks
Brooklyn Nets players
Centers (basketball)
Cleveland Cavaliers players
McDonald's High School All-Americans
Texas Longhorns men's basketball players